Sergio Sighinolfi (April 25, 1925 in Modena – September 7 1956 in San Venanzio) was an Italian racing driver. He entered a Formula One race in 1952 as reserve driver for Scuderia Ferrari. But as all the Ferrari drivers started the race, Sighinolfi could not. He never participated in Formula One again. He did however enter 37 sports car races between 1948 and 1955, his best results being two victories, three second-place finishes and two third-place finishes. He died at the age of 31 the day after crashing into a truck, driving a Ferrari prototype, in San Venanzio, between Modena and Maranello.

List of results

References

1925 births
1956 deaths
Italian racing drivers
Sportspeople from Modena
Road incident deaths in Italy
Mille Miglia drivers